South High Community School (SHCS) is a high school located in Worcester, Massachusetts, United States.

Demographics
According to the Massachusetts Department of Education, the demographic profile of South High was as follows in the 2015–2016 school year:

Male - 52.5%
Female - 47.5%
Hispanic - 42%
White - 23.3%
African American - 17.4%
Asian - 14.5%
Multiracial, non-Hispanic - 2.6%
Native American - 0.1%

Notable alumni
 Cedric Ball (1986/87) - NBA basketball player with the LA Clippers
 Harvey Ball - artist known for designing the smiley face
 Robert Benchley - humorist known for writing for The New Yorker and writing and starring in the Academy Award-winning short film How to Sleep
 Robert H. Goddard (1904) - engineer, professor, physicist, inventor; credited with creating and building the world's first liquid-fueled rocket
 Arthur Kennedy - Tony (1949) and Golden Globe (1955) winning actor with five Oscar nominations
 David LeBoeuf (2008) - state representative (D-Worcester), 2019–present
 Joyner Lucas - two-time Grammy-nominated rapper
 Paul V. Mullaney (1938) - Mayor of Worcester (1963–65) and Marine Corps veteran of World War II and the Korean War

References

High schools in Worcester, Massachusetts
Public high schools in Massachusetts